Coburg Peak is the rocky peak rising to 754 m in Erul Heights on Trinity Peninsula in Graham Land, Antarctica.  It is surmounting Cugnot Ice Piedmont to the northeast.

The peak is named after the Bulgarian royal house of Coburg (Saxe-Coburg-Gotha), 1887–1946.

Location
German-British mapping in 1996.

Maps
 Trinity Peninsula. Scale 1:250000 topographic map No. 5697. Institut für Angewandte Geodäsie and British Antarctic Survey, 1996.
 Antarctic Digital Database (ADD). Scale 1:250000 topographic map of Antarctica. Scientific Committee on Antarctic Research (SCAR), 1993–2016.

Notes

References
 Coburg Peak. SCAR Composite Antarctic Gazetteer.
 Bulgarian Antarctic Gazetteer. Antarctic Place-names Commission. (details in Bulgarian, basic data in English)

External links
 Coburg Peak. Copernix satellite image

Mountains of Trinity Peninsula
Bulgaria and the Antarctic